The Abbey of Santa Maria della Ferraria was a Cistercian monastery located in Vairano Patenora, Province of Caserta, Italy.
 Presently only ruins remain.

History
It was founded in 1179 by monks from the abbey of Fossanova in Lazio, which had been funded by monks under the guidance of the Abbey of Clairvaux.

The church was consecrated on October 24, 1179 and the abbey was ruled by Cistercians until the suppression of religious orders in the Kingdom of Naples by Joseph Bonaparte in 1807.

The following monasteries were subservient to the abbey: Santa Maria dell'Arco (Sicily), Santo Spirito della Valle (Apulia), Santa Maria Incoronata (Apulia) and Santi Vito e Salvo (Abruzzo).

Around 1228, the Chronica Romanorum pontificum et imperatorum ac de rebus in Apulia gestis was composed at the abbey. It is an important source on the abbey's early history.

See also
 List of Cistercian monasteries

References

Bibliography

External links

Ferraria
Churches in the province of Caserta
Romanesque architecture in Campania
Churches completed in 1179
12th-century Roman Catholic church buildings in Italy